Paolo Ruggiero (born 26 September 1957, in Naples) is a General in the Italian Army and current Deputy Supreme Allied Commander Transformation in Norfolk, Virginia.

Military career 
Ruggiero joined the military in the 1970's. He reached the rank of Brigadier General by 2005. He commanded the "Ariete" Armoured Brigade in Pordenone from 2006 to 2008. During this time, he was deployed with his Brigade to Southern Lebanon for Operation UNIFIL II, where as Commander of Sector West he led a multinational unit composed of troops from Italy, France, Ghana, Slovenia, South Korea and Qatar.

In 2009 he was promoted to Major General and appointed as Artillery Commander and Inspector General in Bracciano, from 2010 to 2012

Upon promotion to Lieutenant General in 2014, he was appointed Commander of the Army Command for Education, Training and School of Application Studies in Turin.

In 2015 he was deployed to Afghanistan with the "Resolute Support” Mission where he served first as Chief of Staff and then as Deputy Commander

From January 2016 to February 2019, Ruggiero was appointed Deputy Commander of the NATO Allied Land Command (LANDCOM) in Izmir, Turkey. On 19 July 2019, he was appointed Deputy Supreme Allied Commander Transformation (DSACT) in Norfolk, Virginia, U.S.

During his career, Ruggiero has held several positions in both the Italian Army General Staff (GS) and the Department of Defense. From 1997 to 2000, he was the Assistant Military Attaché at the Italian Embassy in Washington D.C. (USA).

Awards and decorations

Foreign decorations

Other decorations

References

External links 

Military personnel from Naples
1957 births
NATO officials
Living people
Italian Army generals